Muppets Most Wanted is a 2014 American musical heist comedy film and the eighth theatrical film featuring the Muppets. Directed by James Bobin and written by Bobin and Nicholas Stoller, the film is a sequel to The Muppets (2011) and stars Ricky Gervais, Ty Burrell and Tina Fey, as well as Muppets performers Steve Whitmire, Eric Jacobson, Dave Goelz, Bill Barretta, David Rudman, Matt Vogel and Peter Linz. In the film, the Muppets become involved in an international crime caper while on a world tour in Europe.

Aside from co-writer Jason Segel, the majority of the production team behind The Muppets returned for Muppets Most Wanted, including Bobin, Stoller and producers David Hoberman and Todd Lieberman. Bret McKenzie and Christophe Beck returned to compose the film's songs and musical score, respectively. Principal photography commenced in January 2013 at Pinewood Studios in Buckinghamshire, England.

Muppets Most Wanted had its world premiere at the El Capitan Theatre in Los Angeles on March 11, 2014, and was released theatrically in North America on March 21, 2014, by Walt Disney Studios Motion Pictures. The film was not as successful as its predecessor, grossing $80.4 million worldwide on a budget of $51 million. It received positive reviews from critics who praised its humor, music and emotion. The film was dedicated to Muppets performer Jerry Nelson, who died during the film's development, and Jane Henson, who died two months into production.

Plot

Directly after the previous film, the Muppets find themselves at a loss as to what to do until a man named Dominic Badguy suggests the Muppets go on a European tour with him as their tour manager. Unbeknownst to the Muppets, criminal mastermind Constantine, who resembles Kermit, escapes from a Siberian Gulag to join Dominic in a plot to steal the British Crown Jewels.

In Berlin, Dominic secures the Muppets a show at a prestigious venue. Frustrated with the group's incessant requests and Miss Piggy's insistence they marry, Kermit takes a walk at Dominic's suggestion. Constantine ambushes him, glues a stick-on mole to Kermit's face, and slips away. Mistaken for Constantine, Kermit is arrested and sent to the Gulag.

Replacing Kermit, Constantine blunders in imitating him, but the other Muppets fall for his act, though Animal and Walter become suspicious. After the Berlin show opens with Constantine freezing in front of the audience, Scooter has to take over. Constantine and Dominic steal paintings from a museum during the show.

The next morning, Interpol agent Jean Pierre Napoleon and CIA agent Sam Eagle grudgingly team up to apprehend the culprit whom Napoleon believes to be his nemesis "The Lemur" - the number-two criminal in the world.

Meanwhile, Kermit attempts several escapes from the Gulag but is thwarted each time by warden Nadya, who is as infatuated with him as Piggy is. Thus uncaring that the real Constantine is free, Nadya orders Kermit to help organize The Siberian Gulag Revue, the prisoners' annual talent show.

Following hidden instructions on the stolen painting, Constantine and Dominic divert the tour to Madrid. Constantine allows the Muppets to perform whatever they wish. During this show, Constantine and Dominic break into a museum and destroy a roomful of busts to find a key needed for their plan. Even though the performance is a disaster, the Muppets receive critical acclaim. Sam and Napoleon deduce that the connection between the crimes is the Muppet tour, and the pair interrogates the Muppets, only for Constantine to evade the pair and the others to be found too ill-equipped to be guilty. The instructions on the stolen key lead Constantine and Dominic to schedule the next show in order to rob the Bank of Ireland in Dublin.

In Dublin, Walter discovers that Dominic has been giving away show tickets and bribing critics to ensure a packed house and rave reviews, while Fozzie notices Kermit's and Constantine's similarities. Constantine attacks Walter and Fozzie for their discoveries, but Animal stops him and the three escape to rescue Kermit. During the performance, Dominic steals a locket from the bank and Constantine proposes to Piggy onstage; Piggy accepts, and the pair plan a wedding ceremony to be held at the Tower of London in London, where the Crown Jewels are kept.

Fozzie, Walter and Animal reach the Siberian Gulag on the night of the performance, and Kermit uses it as a front to allow them, himself, and all the prisoners to escape the Gulag.

Kermit, Fozzie, Walter and Animal infiltrate Constantine's dressing room and overhear him explain to Dominic that he plans to kill Piggy after they are married. Kermit and Fozzie are briefly detained by Sam, but escape as the wedding begins, and Dominic, with the help of Bobby Benson's Baby Band, manages to steal the jewels. Kermit interrupts the ceremony, revealing Constantine's ruse, and Piggy's ring—actually a bomb—is removed with Bunsen's magnetic bomb attractor vest, worn by Beaker.

Constantine takes Piggy hostage and flees to a helicopter, where he is intercepted by Dominic, who is actually the Lemur and intends to double-cross him. Constantine, after berating Dominic for bragging about the double-cross before escaping, ejects him from the helicopter and tries to take off with Piggy, but Kermit jumps aboard and the rest of the Muppets climb atop each other to stop the escape. Kermit and Piggy incapacitate Constantine, who is arrested with Dominic by Sam and Napoleon. Nadya then arrives to recapture Kermit for escaping despite him being framed & innocent from the start, but Walter, Fozzie, Gonzo, Rowlf, Scooter, and Piggy tell her that if she arrests him, then she will have to take them as well. She relents, allowing Kermit to go free.

The Muppets place their next venue at the Gulag in their finale.

Cast
 Ricky Gervais as Dominic Badguy/The Lemur, the world's second most wanted criminal and Constantine's accomplice who poses as the manager of a fictional international talent agency.
 Ty Burrell as Jean Pierre Napoleon, a French Interpol agent who works with Sam Eagle on finding Constantine.
 Tina Fey as Nadya, a high-ranking prison guard at Gulag 38B who is obsessed with Kermit the Frog.

Muppet performers
 Steve Whitmire as Kermit the Frog, Foo-Foo, Statler, Beaker, Lips, Rizzo the Rat, Link Hogthrob and the Newsman
 Eric Jacobson as Miss Piggy, Fozzie Bear, Sam Eagle and Animal
 Dave Goelz as The Great Gonzo, Dr. Bunsen Honeydew, Zoot, Beauregard and Waldorf
 Bill Barretta as Pepe the King Prawn, Rowlf the Dog, Dr. Teeth, The Swedish Chef, Bobo the Bear, Big Mean Carl, Baby Boss, Carlo Flamingo and Leprechaun Security Guard
 David Rudman as Scooter, Janice, Miss Poogy, Bobby Benson Wayne and Nigel
 Matt Vogel as Constantine, Floyd Pepper, Sweetums, Pops, Robin, Lew Zealand, Crazy Harry, '80s Robot, Camilla and Uncle Deadly
 Peter Linz as Walter and Manolo Flamingo
 Louise Gold as Annie Sue and Wanda

Cameo guest stars
Tony Bennett, Lady Gaga, Salma Hayek, Saoirse Ronan and Christoph Waltz appear as themselves.

Jemaine Clement plays The Prison King and Danny Trejo, Dylan "Hornswoggle" Postl, Ray Liotta,Tom Hiddleston and Josh Groban appear as Gulag 38B inmates. Stanley Tucci plays Ivan, a Gulag 38B Watchtower Guard.

James McAvoy, Chloë Grace Moretz, Miranda Richardson, Russell Tovey, Mackenzie Crook, Toby Jones, Rob Corddry, Hugh Bonneville, Sean "Diddy" Combs, Celine Dion, Zach Galifianakis, Frank Langella, Ross Lynch, Til Schweiger and Usher also appear in minor cameos.

Some actors filmed scenes that were cut from the theatrical film release, but were later restored on the film’s DVD and Blu-ray release. The actors include: Bridgit Mendler, Debby Ryan, Dexter Fletcher, Peter Serafinowicz, Jake Short, and Tyrel Jackson Williams.

Production

Development
In March 2012, after the critical and commercial success of The Muppets, Walt Disney Studios negotiated a deal with James Bobin and Nicholas Stoller to direct and write, respectively, an eighth installment. Disney green-lit the film on April 24, 2012. Along with Brian Henson, Bobin is the only other person to have directed two Muppet films.

Writing began in April 2012 after a couple of weeks of outlining. Jason Segel, co-writer and star of the previous film, declined any involvement with the eighth entry, citing that he had accomplished his ambition of bringing the characters to the forefront with the 2011 film. Despite this, Bobin and Stoller quickly began work on the film based on Disney's demand. Taking on the form of a caper, the film was inspired by both The Great Muppet Caper and The Muppets Take Manhattan as well as The Pink Panther and The Thomas Crown Affair. Bobin said that the film was "a tip of the hat to the old-school crime capers of the '60s, but featuring a frog, a pig, a bear, and a dog—no panthers, even pink ones—along with the usual Muppet-y mix of mayhem, music and laughs".

The first actor to be attached to the film was Christoph Waltz in the role of an Interpol inspector. Waltz dropped out due to scheduling conflicts and was replaced by Ty Burrell. In December 2012, Ricky Gervais confirmed his casting. Tina Fey was later confirmed in January of the following year.

Filming
Originally commissioned under the title The Muppets ... Again!, principal photography began in July 2013, at London's Pinewood Studios in Iver, Buckinghamshire. Filming also took place at the Tower of London, a site where the Crown Estate rarely grants permission to do so. Additional filming locations in London included Leicester Square, Tower Hill, the Richmond Theatre, Wilton's Music Hall, Freemasons' Hall and The Historic Dockyard, Chatham. In addition to the United Kingdom, scenes were also shot at Union Station, the Walt Disney Studios lot, and on Hollywood Boulevard (to recreate the previous film's ending) in Los Angeles. On June 13, 2013, the title of the film was changed from The Muppets ... Again! to Muppets Most Wanted, although the original title is mentioned in the opening song.

The production design was done by Eve Stewart, who took a tongue-in-cheek approach to each country setting while also being influenced by the retro style of "crime capers of the '60s and '70s". Rahel Afiley returned as the costume designer, compiling the wardrobe for both Muppet and human characters. In addition to Afiley's own creations, English fashion designer Vivienne Westwood also contributed four outfits for Miss Piggy while United States retailer Brooks Brothers created more than 200 items for the male cast. Discussing Miss Piggy's wedding gown, Westwood said, "It's called the Court dress and is inspired by 17th-century English royalty and the court of King Charles II. It has been designed ... in a white pearl sequin fabric made from recycled water bottles."

Post-production

Visual effects were done primarily by The Senate Visual Effects. The effects studio worked on 425 shots that included CG builds and set extensions, matte paintings, particle and laser effects, animation, and rod removals. Additional visual effects work was done by Double Negative, Factory VFX, and Nvizible. As with the previous installment, the film required blue screen for scenes that required digital compositing. While green screen is more traditional for color keying, the screen's shade of green would clash with Kermit and therefore be unusable; Sam Eagle's shade of blue is suitable on blue screen.

Audio mixing and editorial services were done by Todd Soundelux and 424 Post. Based out of Todd-AO's Santa Monica facility, Kevin O'Connell and Beau Borders worked on the film as re-recording mixers alongside 424 Post's supervising sound editors Kami Asgar and Sean McCormack.

The first assembly cut of the film ran around two and a half hours.

Music

The musical score for Muppets Most Wanted was composed by Christophe Beck, with additional songs by Bret McKenzie. A soundtrack album was released by Walt Disney Records on March 18, 2014. It features six original songs by McKenzie as well as re-recordings of contemporary music and past Muppet songs, including "Blue Danube Waltz" from The Muppets Take Manhattan. A separate album entirely containing Beck's score (paired with the score for The Muppets, also composed by Beck) was released by Walt Disney Records and Intrada Records on April 15, 2014.

Release
Muppets Most Wanted held its world premiere on March 11, 2014, at the El Capitan Theatre in Hollywood, California. The film was theatrically released in the United States on March 21 and in the United Kingdom on March 28, 2014. Theatrically, the film was accompanied by Pixar's Monsters University short Party Central.

Marketing
A teaser trailer was released on August 6, 2013, and was attached theatrically to screenings of Planes. On November 20, 2013, two different trailers were released, one for the United States and one for the United Kingdom.

In February 2014, the Muppets starred alongside Terry Crews in a commercial for Toyota that aired during the Super Bowl. Later that month, Disney partnered with Subway to promote healthy eating through an advertisement featuring the Muppets. In early March, the restaurant chain started giving away free Muppet-themed bags with kids meals. Spoof posters were released for the film, parodying Skyfall (called Frogfall), The World Is Not Enough (called The Pig Is Not Enough), Face/Off (called Fraud/Frog), and Tinker Tailor Soldier Spy (called Animal Piggy Frog Spy).

In February, the Android and iOS game My Muppets Show added content from the film, including a Big House stage, various props from the movie, and Constantine as a discoverable/purchasable character. From March 20 to April 1, Disney's online game Club Penguin hosted a special Muppets World Tour event. Players were able to visit nine country-themed rooms and perform alongside several Muppets.

Home media
Muppets Most Wanted was released by Walt Disney Studios Home Entertainment on Blu-ray and DVD on August 12, 2014. The Blu-ray bonus features include three cuts of the film: the original theatrical cut (107 minutes), a truncated Statler and Waldorf cut (2 minutes), and an extended cut featuring 12 minutes of scenes not shown in the theatrical version (124 minutes). Also included are a blooper reel, a featurette called "Rizzo's Biggest Fan," and a music video of "I'll Get You What You Want" featuring Bret McKenzie.

Reception

Box office
Muppets Most Wanted grossed $51.2 million in North America, and $29.2 million in other countries, for a worldwide total of $80.4 million. The film earned $4.7 million on its opening day, and opened to number two in its first weekend, with $17 million, behind Divergent. Considering that pre-release tracking had forecast Muppets Most Wanted at opening with takings of more than $20 million, Walt Disney Studios Motion Pictures distribution chief Dave Hollis said the film's opening was "definitely disappointing". Hollis said there was never a comparison between the previous film and its sequel, since Thanksgiving is a concentrated time for family moviegoing. Other reasons cited for the film's failure can be contributed to the then-recent events that occurred in Crimea and Ukraine as a significant chunk of the film takes place in a Russian gulag and its over-reliance on marketing. In its second weekend, the film dropped to number three, grossing $11.3 million, leading to a better second weekend than its predecessor. In its third weekend, the film dropped to number five, grossing $5.1 million. In its fourth weekend, the film dropped to number nine, grossing $2.3 million.

Critical response

Review aggregator Rotten Tomatoes gave the film a score of 80% based on reviews from 197 critics, with a rating average of 6.7/10. The site's consensus stated: "While it may not reach the delirious heights of The Muppets, Muppets Most Wanted still packs in enough clever gags, catchy songs, and celebrity cameos to satisfy fans of all ages." Metacritic gave the film a score of 61/100 based on 37 reviews indicating "generally favorable reviews". CinemaScore audiences gave Muppets Most Wanted a "B+" grade rating on an A+ to F scale.

Alonso Duralde of The Wrap compared the film favorably to the 2011 predecessor, elaborating, "Muppets Most Wanted remains sensational and celebrational, proving beyond a doubt that these beloved characters will continue to lead a plush life on the big screen for years to come." Despite reservations over the previous installment, Brian Henson called Most Wanted a great Muppets film, saying, "I think my dad would be thrilled the Muppets are continuing. That's a big deal." Peter Hartlaub of the San Francisco Chronicle gave the film three out of four stars, saying "It just feels like something the original Muppet creators might have done." John Hartl of The Seattle Times gave the film three out of four stars, saying "Most of the laughs come courtesy of Tina Fey, in the role of a Siberian prison guard who can't/won't stop dancing." Todd McCarthy of The Hollywood Reporter had a mixed reaction; praising Bret McKenzie's songs and the film's humor, but labeling the film overall as "an oddly off-key follow-up". Justin Chang of Variety gave a negative review, stating that the film "looks and sounds eager to please but immediately feels like a more slapdash, aimless affair, trying—and mostly failing—to turn its stalled creativity into some sort of self-referential joke." Anna Smith of Time Out gave the film three out of five stars, saying "'Everybody knows that the sequel's never quite as good,' sing our fluffy friends during the opening number of a film with much to live up to after 2011's terrific reboot, The Muppets. The joke proves self-fulfilling." Bill Goodykoontz of The Arizona Republic gave the film four out of five stars, saying "Although this movie has lots of laughs and a willingness to poke fun at itself, it doesn't quite recapture the magic of the last movie. Close, but not quite."

Jake Coyle of the Associated Press gave the film two and a half stars out of four, saying "Muppets Most Wanted fails to whip up the kind of furry frenzy that makes the Muppets special." Kyle Smith of the New York Post gave the film two and a half stars out of four, saying "The movie seems longer than it is, plus it's just plain too long. Ah, but those jokes are frequently brilliant." Peter Travers of Rolling Stone gave the film two and a half stars out of four, saying "The breaking point of stretching this one joke is reached early. Luckily, Muppet good will helps get you through the rest." Joe Neumaier of the New York Daily News gave the film three out of five stars, saying "The film's slightly overplotted feel is offset by the zippiest musical numbers since the Muppets' deservedly beloved 1979 film." J. R. Jones of the Chicago Reader gave the film a negative review, saying "The verbal wit is fairly weak this time around, though as in the previous film there's an endless succession of three-second star cameos." Tom Russo of The Boston Globe gave the film three out of four stars, saying "The well-worn plot basics are dressed up nicely by the film's consistently clever humor, as well as a celebrity cameo roster that's stacked even by Muppet standards." Bill Zwecker of the Chicago Sun-Times gave the film three out of four stars, saying "The pacing is spot-on, and Fey's Russian guard and Ty Burrell's Interpol agent are wonderful human additions to this comedic romp." Neil Genzlinger of The New York Times gave the film a positive review, saying "It all adds up to an eventful entry in the Muppet film library but not a classic one." Claudia Puig of USA Today gave the film three out of four stars, calling the film "A breezy, mirthful caper enlivened by the comic talents of Ricky Gervais, Ty Burrell and Tina Fey."

Frank Lovece of Newsday gave the film three out of four stars, saying "While it may not be sensational, it's still an inspirational, celebrational, Muppetational Muppet show." Peter Howell of the Toronto Star gave the film two and a half stars out of four, saying "You don't go to a Muppet movie looking for anything other than a few laughs with beloved puppet pals. Mission accomplished—ka-ching!—on that front." David Hiltbrand of The Philadelphia Inquirer gave the film two and a half stars out of four, saying "Sunny and cheerful, Muppets Most Wanted is a cascade of epic silliness, good for a few fleeting and familiar chuckles." Chris Nashawaty of Entertainment Weekly gave the film a B, saying "The songs are infectious, but the rest (despite turns by Tina Fey and Ty Burrell) lacks some of the gang's usual feel-good joy." Christopher Orr of The Atlantic gave the film a positive review, saying "Kids will enjoy it, and there are more than enough clever gags to keep parents amused. But the film lacks the tenderness and rich nostalgia that made The Muppets such an improbable delight." Erik Adams of The A.V. Club gave the film a B−, saying "The Muppets are creatures of indulgence, and their sense of humor is one of excess. Muppets Most Wanted is a mess of a movie, but anything tidier would be a poor fit." Betsy Sharkey of the Los Angeles Times gave the film a positive review, saying "Though there are many delicious little moments tucked inside, the action heads in so many directions it can be dizzying to keep up." Steve Persall of the Tampa Bay Times gave the film a B, saying "Muppets Most Wanted is pleasant enough to recommend as family entertainment. But the movie falls short of what immediately preceded it, musically and emotionally."

Dana Stevens of Slate gave the film a negative review, saying "There's something sour and strained about this movie that's at odds with the usual Muppet ethos of game, let's-put-on-a-show cheer. Maybe that's because of the inordinate amount of screen time spent on the rivalry between two villains who are as uninteresting as they are unpleasant." Michael Phillips of the Chicago Tribune gave the film two out of four stars, saying "Part of the problem here is one of proportion: The movie throws a misjudged majority of the material to the villains and lets the unfashionably sincere and sweet-natured Muppets fend for themselves." Robbie Collin of The Daily Telegraph gave the film two out of five stars, saying "Muppet film number eight is a resounding disappointment: it's uneven and often grating, with only a few moments of authentic delight, and almost none of the sticky-sweet, toast-and-honey crunch of its vastly enjoyable 2011 forerunner." James Berardinelli of ReelViews gave the film three out of four stars, saying "The inevitable sequel, arriving three years later, isn't as giddily entertaining as its predecessor but much of the charm remains, making this an ideal destination for a family excursion." Eric Henderson of Slant Magazine gave the film three out of four stars, saying "Freed from the burden of starting anew, the film restores the Muppets' rightful place as stars of their own show." Steve Davis of The Austin Chronicle gave the film three out of five stars, saying "This re-energized franchise has found its second wind, bursting with a creative vitality and boisterous humor that makes everything seem new again."

Accolades
The Academy of Motion Picture Arts and Sciences placed Muppets Most Wanted on its shortlist of potential nominees for the Academy Award for Best Original Song ("I'll Get You What You Want (Cockatoo In Malibu)", "Something So Right", and "We're Doing a Sequel"), but ultimately was not nominated for the award.

References

External links

  at Disney.com
 
 
 
 
 

2010s children's comedy films
2010s crime comedy films
2010s English-language films
2010s musical comedy films
2010s satirical films
2014 comedy films
2014 films
American children's comedy films
American children's musical films
American crime comedy films
American heist films
American musical comedy films
American satirical films
American sequel films
Backstage musicals
Films about the Central Intelligence Agency
Films based on television series
Films directed by James Bobin
Films produced by David Hoberman
Films produced by Todd Lieberman
Films scored by Christophe Beck
Films set in Berlin
Films set in Europe
Films set in Geneva
Films set in London
Films set in Los Angeles
Films set in Madrid
Films set in museums
Films set in prison
Films set in Siberia
Films set in studio lots
Films set in Switzerland
Films set on trains
Films about theft
Films shot at Pinewood Studios
Films shot in Buckinghamshire
Films shot in London
Films shot in Los Angeles
Films with screenplays by Nicholas Stoller
Jukebox musical films
Mandeville Films films
Self-reflexive films
The Muppets films
Walt Disney Pictures films
2010s American films